Elbe Air Lufttransport GmbH, usually just known as Elbe Air, was a corporate charter airline from Germany, which offered worldwide on-demand flight services. The company was headquartered in Büren, Westphalia and had its operational base at nearby Paderborn Lippstadt Airport.

History
In 2002, Elbe Air operated a fleet of three Dassault Falcon 20 jets. In the same year, reports surfaced about poor safety and security standards with the airline. A former pilot had filed a report with the German Federal Aviation Office, concerning poorly trained pilots and ageing aircraft, which had not been properly maintained.

The airline filed for bankruptcy and was liquidated in 2008.

References

Defunct airlines of Germany
Airlines established in 1995
Airlines disestablished in 2008
German companies disestablished in 2008
German companies established in 1995